Poutník Brewery is a brewery in Pelhřimov, Czech Republic.

History 
The town of Pelhřimov was granted brewing rights in 1552. At first the beer was brewed in various town houses. In the 17th century the burghers decided to establish a communal brewery. The brewery was moved multiple times to different locations due to insufficient space.

In 1899 the current brewery building complex was built at the Na hradišti location. It was designed for lager brewing and was equipped by modern technologies of the era. In 1948 the brewery was nationalized and directed by n. p. Jihočeské pivovary. The company was bought by DUP Pelhřimov in 2001 and the name of the brewery was changed to Poutník.

Beers 

 Poutník 10° (4.0% abv) pale lager
 Poutník 11° (4.5% abv) pale lager
 Poutník 12° (5.0% abv) pale lager
 Poutník 12° Hořký (5.0% abv) pale lager with extra hops
 Poutník 14° (5.8% abv) strong pale lager, sold only during Christmas and Easter times

References

External links 
 
 Official website of DUP Pelhřimov

Breweries in the Czech Republic
Food and drink companies established in 1899
Beer brands of the Czech Republic
Manufacturing companies of the Czech Republic